The 1942 New York Giants season was the franchise's 60th season. The team finished in third place in the National League with an 85–67 record, 20 games behind the St. Louis Cardinals.

Offseason 
 Prior to 1942 season: Al Sima was signed as an amateur free agent by the Giants.

Regular season

Season standings

Record vs. opponents

Opening Day lineup 
Billy Werber 3b
Billy Jurges ss
Mel Ott rf
Johnny Mize 1b
Willard Marshall lf
Hank Leiber cf
Harry Danning c
Mickey Witek 2b
Carl Hubbell p

Roster

Player stats

Batting

Starters by position 
Note: Pos = Position; G = Games played; AB = At bats; H = Hits; Avg. = Batting average; HR = Home runs; RBI = Runs batted in

Other batters 
Note: G = Games played; AB = At bats; H = Hits; Avg. = Batting average; HR = Home runs; RBI = Runs batted in

Pitching

Starting pitchers 
Note: G = Games pitched; IP = Innings pitched; W = Wins; L = Losses; ERA = Earned run average; SO = Strikeouts

Other pitchers 
Note: G = Games pitched; IP = Innings pitched; W = Wins; L = Losses; ERA = Earned run average; SO = Strikeouts

Relief pitchers 
Note: G = Games pitched; W = Wins; L = Losses; SV = Saves; ERA = Earned run average; SO = Strikeouts

Farm system 

LEAGUE CHAMPIONS: Fort Smith, Bristol

Evangeline League folded, May 30, 1942

Notes

References 
 1942 New York Giants team page at Baseball Reference
 1942 New York Giants team page at Baseball Almanac

New York Giants (NL)
San Francisco Giants seasons
New York Giants season
New York
1940s in Manhattan
Washington Heights, Manhattan